The Port of Šventoji is a port in the city of Šventoji, Lithuania. It is located at the mouth of Šventoji River and Baltic Sea. The new port of Šventoji is currently under construction.

References

Sventoji
Palanga City Municipality